David Graeme Farrant (born 1 August 1960) is a former New Zealand first-class cricketer who played for Canterbury in the 1980s. He is the younger brother of Anthony Farrant.

Farrant was on the New Zealand under-20s (Brabin) cricket team in 1979–1980. His son, Matthew Farrant, is also a cricketer and played for Canterbury at the under-19 level.

References

1960 births
Living people
New Zealand cricketers
Canterbury cricketers
People from Fairlie, New Zealand
Cricketers from Canterbury, New Zealand